The term compelled signalling refers to a class of telecommunications signalling protocols where receipt of each discrete signal needs to be explicitly acknowledged before the next signal is able to be sent.

For example, in R2 register signalling, the transmission of each signal involves the following five events:
The outgoing trunk begins sending the tones that correspond to the signal it wishes to convey in the forward direction;
The incoming trunk, once it is sure to have correctly detected the above signal, begins sending a set of confirmation tones in the backward direction;
The outgoing trunk, once it is sure to have correctly detected the confirmation tones, stops sending the signal tones in the forward direction;
The incoming trunk, once it is sure to have detected the end of the signal tones (that is: that the forward channel is now silent) stops sending its confirmation tones in the backward direction;
Before being able to begin sending the next signal, if any, the outgoing trunk needs to ensure that it is receiving silence on the backward channel.

The term is only relevant in the case of signalling systems that use discrete signals (e.g. a combination of tones to denote one digit), as opposed to signalling systems which are message-oriented, such as Signaling System 7 (SS7) and ISDN Q.931, where each message is able to convey multiple items of information (e.g. multiple digits of the called telephone number).

Compelled signalling is not suitable for satellite communication due to the long propagation delay.

The contrary of compelled signalling is referred to as non-compelled signalling. An example includes DTMF, where the originating side sends tones and silence in the forward direction, without being able to ascertain whether each tone has been correctly received by the terminating side. In order to minimise the risk of signalling errors, minimum durations are imposed, both on the tones and on the intervening periods of silence.

References 

Telephony signals